Ulaşlı Şıxlı (also spelled Ulashlyshykhly) is a village in the Goychay Rayon of Azerbaijan.  The village forms part of the municipality of Potu.

References

External links

Populated places in Goychay District